Tazehabad-e Qeruchay (also Romanized as Tāzehābād-e Qerūchāy; also known as Tāzehābād and Tāzehābād-e Qūrīchāy) is a village in Quri Chay Rural District, in the Central District of Dehgolan County, Kurdistan Province, Iran. At the 2006 census, its population was 277, in 64 families. The village is populated by Kurds.

References 

Towns and villages in Dehgolan County
Kurdish settlements in Kurdistan Province